John Nyumbu (born 31 May 1985) is a Zimbabwean cricketer. He is right-handed tail-ended batsman and right arm off break bowler.

Career
He made his Test cricket debut for Zimbabwe against South Africa at Harare Sports Club in August 2014 in which he took five wickets in the first innings and became second Zimbabwean cricketer after Andy Blignaut. He made his One Day International debut later that same month, also against South Africa.

In May 2018, he took his 200th first-class wicket in his 73rd first-class match. He was the leading wicket-taker for Matabeleland Tuskers in the 2017–18 Pro50 Championship tournament, with eleven dismissals in eight matches.

In June 2018, he was named in a Board XI team for warm-up fixtures ahead of the 2018 Zimbabwe Tri-Nation Series. Later the same month, he was named in a 22-man preliminary Twenty20 International (T20I) squad for the tri-nation series. He made his T20I debut for Zimabwbe against Pakistan on 1 July 2018, during the tri-series.

In December 2020, he was selected to play for the Tuskers in the 2020–21 Logan Cup.

References

External links
 

1985 births
Living people
Zimbabwean cricketers
Zimbabwe Test cricketers
Zimbabwe One Day International cricketers
Zimbabwe Twenty20 International cricketers
Cricketers from Bulawayo
Cricketers who have taken five wickets on Test debut
Matabeleland Tuskers cricketers